Elyssa East is an American nonfiction writer. She is the author of the creative nonfiction book Dogtown: Death and Enchantment in a New England Ghost Town, which chronicles a murder that occurred in an area known as Dogtown, Massachusetts, just outside Gloucester, in 1984. As part of her research for the book, East interviewed the murderer, Peter Hodgkins, in prison. This nonfiction book won the 2010 L. L. Winship/P.E.N. New England Award and has been critically reviewed.  According to East, the book was inspired in part by the paintings of Dogtown by Marsden Hartley.

East grew up in Marietta, GA and attended Reed College, where she graduated with a degree in Art History in 1994.  She went on to receive an MFA from Columbia University.  She currently lives in New York. She has previously taught Creative Writing at Purchase College and Rhode Island School of Design, and is currently a part-time creative nonfiction instructor at New York University's Gallatin School of Individualized Study.

Awards and honors
 2010 L.L. Winship/PEN New England Award, Dogtown: Death and Enchantment in a New England Ghost Town

References

External links
 

21st-century American novelists
Reed College alumni
Living people
American women novelists
21st-century American women writers
Columbia University School of the Arts alumni
New York University faculty
Novelists from New York (state)
Year of birth missing (living people)
Rhode Island School of Design faculty
American women academics